The Ministry of Telecommunication, Digital Infrastructure and Foreign Employment is the central government ministry of Sri Lanka responsible for telecommunication and digital infrastructure. The ministry is responsible for formulating and implementing national policy on telecommunication and digital infrastructure and other subjects which come under its purview. The current Minister of Telecommunication, Digital Infrastructure and Foreign Employment and Deputy Minister of Telecommunication and Digital Infrastructure are Harin Fernando and Tharanath Basnayake respectively. The ministry's secretary is Wasantha Deshapriya.

Ministers
The Minister of Telecommunication, Digital Infrastructure and Foreign Employment is a member of the Cabinet of Sri Lanka.

Secretaries

References

External links
 

Sri Lanka
Telecommunication, Digital Infrastructure and Foreign Employment
Telecommunication, Digital Infrastructure and Foreign Employment
 
Telecommunications in Sri Lanka